Al Haouafate is a small town and rural commune in Sidi Kacem Province of the Rabat-Salé-Kénitra region of Morocco. At the time of the 2004 census, the commune had a total population of 17,119 people living in 2627 households. The mayor is Abdenabi El Aidoudi.

References

Populated places in Sidi Kacem Province
Rural communes of Rabat-Salé-Kénitra